Wisłok Górny is a village in the Sanok County in the East Małopolska in the Lesser Beskid mountains. It is now part of Wisłok Wielki. It is part of the parish of Nowotaniec.

History
In historical records the village was first mentioned in 1361. The wooden church replaced an older church from at least 1785. The church was destroyed in 1946.  The village was burned down January 24, 1946 by the UPA. In 1785 the village lands comprised 6.14 km². There were 711 Catholics.

Geography
The municipality lies at an altitude of 482 metres and covers an area of 6.3 km². It has a population of about 250 people.

Villages in Sanok County